Gregory Whitehead (Nantucket, MA)  is a writer, radio program maker and audio artist based in Lenox, Massachusetts. Allen S. Weiss considers him to be a major figure in the fields of audio art and radio art. In 2001, Whitehead made a generous private donation to the Åke Blomström Award.

Works
Active in cassette culture during the 1980s, his early works include Disorder Speech (1985), Display Wounds (1986), Beyond the Pleasure Principle (1987), The Pleasure of Ruins (1988), Writing On Air (1988) and Reptiles and Wildfire (1989). In 1991, RRRecords released a 7” vinyl record titled Vicekopf. Whitehead collaborated with Christof Migone on the 1995 radio play, The Thing About Bugs, for New American Radio. Other radioplays from the 1990s include Pressures of the Unspeakable (1992), Nothing But Fog (1996) and Bewitched, Bothered, Bewildered (1997). Since 2000, Whitehead has produced numerous plays and documentary essays for BBC Radio, including The Marilyn Room (2000), American Heavy (2001), The Loneliest Road (2003), On One Lost Hair (2004), No Background Music (2005), The Day King Hammer Fell From The Sky (2007) and Bring Me The Head of Philip K. Dick (2009). The Loneliest Road and No Background Music (featuring Sigourney Weaver) both won Sony Gold Academy Awards.

Awards and honors 
1992 Pressures of the Unspeakable received a Prix Italia award.
1993 Shake, Rattle, Roll received the BBC Newcomer Award at the Prix Futura competition in Berlin.
1995 "The Thing About Bugs", special commendation, Prix Futura
2004 "The Loneliest Road", Sony Gold Radio Academy Award
2006 "No Background Music", Sony Gold Radio Academy Award
2015 "On the Shore Dimly Seen", short-listed for Prix Italia

References
 Jacki Apple, "Screamers", High Performance, Spring, 1992.
 Kristiana Clemens, review, Turned On, Tuning In, Musicworks #95, Spring, 2005, p. 53.
 Kersten Glandien, Art on Air. A Profile of New Radio Art, in: Simon Emmerson (ed), Music, Electronic Media and Culture (Ashgate, 2000).
 Thyrza Nichols Goodeve, "No Wound Ever Speaks For Itself" in Art Forum, January 1992, p. 70.
 Elisabeth Mahoney, review, The Loneliest Road, The Guardian, October 20, 2003
 Joe Milutis, "Radiophonic Ontologies and the Avant-Garde," TDR 40, no. 3 (Fall 1996): 70. 5
 Jon Pareles, review, "Five Concerts All at Once, And It's Quiet", New York Times, April 24, 2004
 Allen S. Weiss, "Purity of Essence", in Breathless: Sound Recording, Disembodiment and the Transformation of Lyrical Nostalgia, Wesleyan University Press, 2002

External links
Official site
Online archive
Interview
Discussion

American male composers
21st-century American composers
People from Lenox, Massachusetts
Living people
American contemporary artists
American sound artists
American radio producers
21st-century American male musicians
Year of birth missing (living people)
Cassette culture 1970s–1990s